Robin Geoffrey Howard (born 1939 in Sheffield, England) is British quantum-fiction writer. His novels include a series of seven books about the space agent Jim Long. and non fiction - How to think like a modern mystic and Psychic Thinker - Magical Theory of Life. All books are published by JL books and RGH Books. 

The 6 books in the series are of the astral quantum fiction genre incorporating stories around the adventures of Jim Long a space agent of the galaxy space police federation. Two huge computers encased in a planet at the centre of the galaxy allow Jim and his crew via bracelets on their wrists to travel in the astral realms and to other inter-dimensions. The galaxy space police federation is central to all the stories and plots. Intriguing and profound story lines allow the reader to explore the afterlife quantum realms of the astral and other dimensions of time beyond belief. An out in space-out of body space agent. The Future Quantum Realities booklet explains the authors psychic view relating to the series. The author in the non fiction range also writes and edits a free booklet titled The Psychic Thinker that depicts who we are, what we are and other psychic events; also How to think like a modern mystic that explores you and the theories of existence.

Publications
 2022  Quantum Inception - second edition changed and re-edited version of Ancient Ones of Light.
 2020  Aberrant Creation
 2016  Magical theory of life - published in December.  
 2015  Adventures in space & fiction fantasy - 4 short Jim Long stories published October - 
 2013  How to think like a modern mystic, non fiction - 
 2012 Battle of the Archangels  
 2009 Divine Fanaticism (   
 2005 Soulgate—Temple of Souls      
 2000 The White Hole   
 1994 Ancient Ones of Light''

References

External links
 Author's Den: Robin Howard

Living people
1939 births
Writers from Sheffield